Murray Charles Wilson (born November 7, 1951) is a Canadian former professional ice hockey forward. He played in the National Hockey League with the Montreal Canadiens and Los Angeles Kings between 1972 and 1979. With the Canadiens he won the Stanley Cup four times.

Playing career
Wilson started his National Hockey League career with the Montreal Canadiens in 1971. Wilson was drafted 11th overall in the 1971 NHL Amateur Draft. He would spend 7 years in Montreal before being traded to the Los Angeles Kings. He won one Calder Cup in the AHL and the Stanley Cup four times with the Canadiens.

He is the brother of former San Jose Sharks GM Doug Wilson.

His name is incorrectly spelled on the Stanley Cup for the 1973, 1976, and 1977 Montreal Canadiens. It appears as "Murry Wilson" missing an a. Wilson was correctly spelled in 1978 as Murray Wilson.

Career statistics

Regular season and playoffs

External links

1951 births
Living people
Canadian ice hockey forwards
Ice hockey people from Toronto
Los Angeles Kings players
Montreal Canadiens draft picks
Montreal Canadiens players
Montreal Canadiens announcers
National Hockey League first-round draft picks
Ottawa 67's players
Stanley Cup champions